Diana Volodymyrivna Shelestyuk is a Ukrainian diver, lives in the city of Nikolaev, Ship area.

She has been involved in sports since the age of six. She won her first sports award in 2005. Diana graduated from the Nikolaev secondary school №54.

She Studies at the Nikolaev National University named after V. A. Sukhomlinsky.

Achievements 
 2012 — European champion in diving from a 1-meter springboard in Austria;
 2013 — a silver medal at the European Championships in Poland, in synchronized diving from a 3-meter springboard with Anna Krasnoshlik;
 2014 — a bronze medal at the European Championships in Italy in synchronized diving from a 3-meter springboard, together with Anna Krasnoshlik;
 a bronze medal in the finals of the women's meter springboard diving competition at the European Games (Baku);
 at the European Games in Baku in synchronized diving from a 3-meter springboard, she won a silver medal together with Margarita Dzhusova;
 2020 — a bronze medal at the FINA 2020 Grand Prix in Madrid, she paired with Elena Fedorova in synchronized jumping from a 3-meter springboard.

References

External links 
 Українські спортсменки Олена Федорова та Діана Шелестюк здобули "бронзу" на турнірі зі стрибків у воду 
 «Такую комбинацию в 17 лет в мире прыгают единицы». Диана Шелестюк из Корабельного едет покорять Европу 

European Championships (multi-sport event) bronze medalists
Ukrainian female divers
European Games competitors for Ukraine
Year of birth missing (living people)
Living people